Rhulani Mokwena (born January 9, 1987) is a South African football manager who is the manager of Mamelodi Sundowns.

The son of former Orlando Pirates player Julias Sono, and nephew to Jomo Sono, Mokwena hails from a footballing family and started his professional coaching career in the youth systems at Silver Stars, before serving as an assistant manager at Mamelodi Sundowns and Pirates. In 2019, he became interim manager of the latter club, holding the position for five months, before being appointed as the head coach at Chippa United the following year.

Early career

Mokwena's first notable foray into football came at Silver Stars, later known as Platinum Stars, where he honed his skills under coaches such as Steve Komphela, Cavin Johnson and Allan Freese. In 2014, he joined Mamelodi Sundowns where, after excelling with the club's development team, he was promoted to be one of manager Pitso Mosimane's assistant managers, alongside Manqoba Mngqithi and Alex Bapela. Mokwena stayed with Masandawana until 2017, helping the club win the 2016 CAF Champions League title, before taking up a role as the assistant manager to Milutin Sredojević at Orlando Pirates.

Managerial career

Orlando Pirates

In August 2019, after Sredojević unexpectedly resigned at Pirates, Mokwena was named as the new interim-manager of the club and he marked his managerial debut with a 1-0 MTN 8 defeat to Highlands Park. Over the next five months, he took charge of 14 matches, winning four, drawing five and losing five, before returning to the assistant manager's role following the appointment of Josef Zinnbauer in December.

Chippa United

On 4 March 2020, Mokwena left Zinnbauer's side after being appointed as the head coach of fellow Premier Division side Chippa United on a short-term deal. However, his time with the club was disrupted by the COVID-19 outbreak, which saw the league suspended later that month, and by the end of his contract in June he had overseen just one match in charge for the season.

Mamelodi Sundowns
In 2020 Mokwena became co-coach of Mamelodi Sundowns alongside Manqoba Mngqithi. In October 2022, "Mngqithi was assigned to a new role as Sundowns' senior coach in what is a demotion from the position of co-coach. He will now be working under new head coach Rhulani Mokwena", Goal.com reported.

Career statistics

Manager

References

1987 births
Living people
South African sportspeople
South African soccer managers
Premier Soccer League managers
Orlando Pirates F.C. managers
Chippa United F.C. managers
Mamelodi Sundowns F.C. managers